Quiet World were an English pop rock band formed by The Heather Brothers John, Lee, and Neil Heather in 1969; to record their concept album The Road. The group consisted of John (vocals, songwriting), Lea (vocals, songwriting), and Neil (songwriting), as well as future Genesis member Steve Hackett (lead guitar) and his brother John Hackett (flute, guitar), Dick Driver (bass) (who would eventually appear in Steve Hackett's band), Gill Gilbert (backing vocals), Phil Henderson (keyboards), Eddy Hines (flute), and Sean O'Mally (drums).

A 7" single "Miss Whittington" / "There is a Mountain" was released on the Dawn label in 1969 (as The Quiet World of Lea & John) and Quiet World released their debut album The Road in 1970. Shortly thereafter, Steve Hackett left to join the progressive rock group Genesis as lead guitarist.  The album was re-released on CD in 1999 .

The Heather Brothers went on to international success with their musicals, A Slice of Saturday Night, Lust and thriller Blood Money. Their shows have enjoyed hundreds of productions worldwide and have been translated into nine languages. They also wrote, directed and produced two films, Seriously Twisted and The Big Finish. They are currently preparing their latest musical Camp Horror for its West End premier.

Phil Henderson composed the score for The Far Pavilions at Shaftesbury Theatre, London, in 2005. The Philip Henderson Orchestra features on Steve Hackett's Feedback 86 album.

Personnel
 Dick Driver - upright bass, electric bass
 Gill Gilbert - backing vocals
 Steve Hackett - electric & acoustic guitars
 John Hackett - flute, acoustic guitars
 John Heather - lead vocals, acoustic guitars, songwriting
 Lea Heather - lead vocals, percussion, songwriting
 Neil Heather - songwriting
 Phil Henderson - piano, organ, trumpet, recorder, arrangement, backing vocals
 Eddy Hines - flute, saxophone
 Sean O'Mally - drums, percussion

Discography
The Road (1970; Dawn)

References

External links 
 
 

English pop rock music groups